Deh-e Maleku (also Romanized as Deh-e Malekū; also known as Deh-e Malek) is a village in Kuhestan Rural District, Rostaq District, Darab County, Fars Province, Iran. At the 2006 census, its population was 96, in 26 families.

References 

Populated places in Darab County